March 13 - Eastern Orthodox liturgical calendar - March 15

All fixed commemorations below are observed on March 27 by Orthodox Churches on the Old Calendar.

For March 14th, Orthodox Churches on the Old Calendar commemorate the Saints listed on March 1.

Saints

 Martyrs Basil and Euphrasius, together with other Christians, in Thessaloniki.
 Martyr Florentius, in Thessaloniki, by fire.  (see also: October 13)
 Martyr Alexander, in Thessaloniki (c. 285-305).
 Martyr Eustathius and his company, at Carrhae, Mesopotamia (741)
 Venerable Euschemon the Confessor, Bishop of Lampsacus (9th century)

Pre-Schism Western saints

 Holy 47 Martyrs of Rome, baptised by the Apostle Peter, and suffered in Rome under Nero, all on the same day (c. 67)
 Hieromartyr Leo, Bishop and Martyr, perhaps under the Arians, in the Agro Verano in Italy.
 Martyrs Peter and Aphrodisius, who obtained the crown of martyrdom in the persecution of the Vandals (5th century)
 Monk-Martyrs of Valeria, in the province of Valeria, Italy, slain by the Lombards (5th century)
 Venerable Benedict of Nursia, Abbot (543)  (see also: July 11 - Translation)
 Saint Diaconus, a deacon in the Marsi in central Italy, martyred together with two monks by the Lombards (6th century)
 Saint Boniface Curetán, a Scoto-Pictish Bishop of Ross (c. 630 or 660)
 Saint Talmach, a disciple of St Barr at Lough Erc in Ireland, and founder of a monastery (7th century)
 Saint Matilda (Mathildis, Maud), wife of German king Henry the Fowler, who founded, among others, the monasteries of Nordhausen, Pöhlde, Engern and Quedlinburg in Germany (968)

Post-Schism Orthodox saints

 Saint Rostislav-Michael, Great Prince of Kiev (1167)
 Saint Theognostus of Kiev, the Greek Metropolitan of Kiev and all Rus' (1353)
 Venerable Andreas (Andrew), Abbot, of the Holy Trinity Monastery in Rafailovo, Siberia (1820)

Other commemorations

 Icon of the Most Holy Theotokos of St. Theodore ("Feodorovskaya"), Kostroma (1239, 1613)  (see also: August 16)
 Repose of Blessed John, Fool-for-Christ of Yurievets (1893)

Icon gallery

Notes

References

Sources
 March 14/March 27. Orthodox Calendar (PRAVOSLAVIE.RU).
 March 27 / March 14. HOLY TRINITY RUSSIAN ORTHODOX CHURCH (A parish of the Patriarchate of Moscow).
 March 14. OCA - The Lives of the Saints.
 The Autonomous Orthodox Metropolia of Western Europe and the Americas (ROCOR). St. Hilarion Calendar of Saints for the year of our Lord 2004. St. Hilarion Press (Austin, TX). p.21.
 March 14. Latin Saints of the Orthodox Patriarchate of Rome.
 The Roman Martyrology. Transl. by the Archbishop of Baltimore. Last Edition, According to the Copy Printed at Rome in 1914. Revised Edition, with the Imprimatur of His Eminence Cardinal Gibbons. Baltimore: John Murphy Company, 1916. pp.75-76.
Greek Sources
 Great Synaxaristes:  14 ΜΑΡΤΙΟΥ. ΜΕΓΑΣ ΣΥΝΑΞΑΡΙΣΤΗΣ.
  Συναξαριστής. 14 Μαρτίου. ECCLESIA.GR. (H ΕΚΚΛΗΣΙΑ ΤΗΣ ΕΛΛΑΔΟΣ).
Russian Sources
  27 марта (14 марта). Православная Энциклопедия под редакцией Патриарха Московского и всея Руси Кирилла (электронная версия). (Orthodox Encyclopedia - Pravenc.ru).
  14 марта (ст.ст.) 27 марта 2013 (нов. ст.). Русская Православная Церковь Отдел внешних церковных связей. (DECR).

March in the Eastern Orthodox calendar